Stephen Fox, 2nd Baron Holland of Holland and 2nd Baron Holland of Foxley (20 February 1745 – 26 December 1774) of Holland House in Kensington, Middlesex, was a British peer.

Biography
Lord Holland was the eldest son of Henry Fox, 1st Baron Holland of Foxley (1705–1774) of Holland House and his wife Lady Caroline Lennox (1723–1774), suo jure 1st Baroness Holland of Holland, a daughter of Charles Lennox, 2nd Duke of Richmond. Stephen and his younger brother, the great Whig statesman Charles James Fox (1749–1806), were a great trial to their parents because of their gambling and other habits.

He was educated at Eton College. 

When his father died on 1 July 1774, Holland inherited his title (Baron Holland of Foxley) and then his mother's title (Baron Holland of Holland) upon her death three weeks later.  Holland died five months later when both titles were inherited by his only son, Henry Vassall-Fox, 3rd Baron Holland of Holland and 3rd Baron Holland of Foxley.

Marriage and children

On 20 April 1766 he married Lady Mary FitzPatrick, a daughter of John FitzPatrick, 1st Earl of Upper Ossory with whom he had two children:

 Henry Vassall-Fox, 3rd Baron Holland of Holland and 3rd Baron Holland of Foxley (1773–1840)
 Hon Caroline Fox (3 November 1767 – 12 March 1845), of Little Holland House, Kensington, who died unmarried aged 78. In 1842, on a site on her brother's Holland House estate and near her home at Little Holland House, she founded a charity school "for the education of children of the labouring, manufacturing and other poorer classes of Kensington", which survives today, on a new location near by, as Fox Primary School.

References

Fox, Stephen
Fox, Stephen
1745 births
1774 deaths
People educated at Eton College
Stephen
2